Burnley is an unincorporated community in Albemarle County, Virginia.

References

Unincorporated communities in Virginia
Unincorporated communities in Albemarle County, Virginia